Lil Bahadur Chettri is an Indian writer in the Nepali language from Assam, India. He is a recipient of Sahitya Academy Award for his book Brahmaputrako Chheu Chhau. His other book Basain is a story of poor villagers who undergo suffering due to the exploitation of the feudal and so-called upper class of the society. It is included in the curriculum of Tribhuwan University, Nepal. In 2016, he was honoured with Jagadamba Shree Purasakar for his contribution to the Nepali literature and language. In 2020, Government of India awarded him Padmashri, the fourth highest civilian award of India for his contribution in literature and education.

Works

Novels 
Basain  (1957)
  Brahmaputraka ChheuChhau (1986)
  Atripta (1969)

Essays 
  Assam Ma Nepali Bhasako Sharogharo (Difficulties of Nepali Language in Assam)

Plays 
  Dobato (Crossroads)

Short stories collection 
  Tindasak Bis Abhibyakti (Twenty Expressions In Three Decades)
Lil Bahadur Chettri ka Kathaharu

See also
 Nepali literature
 List of Sahitya Akademi Award winners for Nepali
Peter J. Karthak
Indra Bahadur Rai

References

Living people
Recipients of the Sahitya Akademi Award in Nepali
Indian male novelists
Writers from Guwahati
20th-century Indian novelists
Novelists from Assam
20th-century Indian male writers
Recipients of the Padma Shri in literature & education
Nepali-language writers from India
English-language writers from India
Indian Gorkhas
1933 births
Jagadamba Shree Puraskar winners
Khas people